Ulysses' Gaze (translit. To Vlemma tou Odyssea) is a 1995 Greek war drama film directed by Theo Angelopoulos, and starring Harvey Keitel, Maia Morgenstern and Erland Josephson. It is loosely based on Homer's epic poem Odyssey.

The film was selected as the Greek entry for the Best Foreign Language Film at the 68th Academy Awards but it was not nominated.

Plot
Successful Greek filmmaker, A (Harvey Keitel), returns to Greece. He has come to participate in a screening of one of his earlier films and to begin a personal journey across the Balkans. After the screening is disrupted by local ideological conflict, A takes a taxi from Greece to Albania. Ostensibly A is searching for 3 undeveloped reels of film shot by the Manaki brothers. The mysterious reels could predate the brother's first film, The Weavers, which is believed to be the first film shot in the Balkans.

A's journey fuses his own memories, the experiences of the Manaki brothers, and contemporary images of the Balkans. A drifts from Albania to North Macedonia, Bulgaria, Romania and Serbia. He travels on a train, a barge laden with a statue of Lenin (Polyphemus) and eventually a row boat. Though A makes some acquaintances along the way, he never lingers. His search for the roots of cinema, memory, and the Balkan identity pull him inevitably towards decay and death.

 eventually travels to the besieged Sarajevo. He meets Ivo Levy (Erland Josephson), the curator of an underground cinema archive who had attempted to develop the missing reels before the war. A convinces Levy to continue his work with the reels. The film ends on a rare foggy day in Sarajevo. Ironically the fog protects locals from snipers and gives the city a rare chance to flourish.  explores the city with Levy's family. Near the river the family encounters military personnel and are executed.

Cast
 Harvey Keitel as A
 Maia Morgenstern as Woman In A's Home Town (Penelope) / Kali (Calypso) / Widow (Circe) / Naomi (Nausicaa)
 Erland Josephson as Ivo Levy
 Thanassis Veggos as Taxi Driver
 Yorgos Michalakopoulos as Nikos
 Dora Volanaki as The Old Lady In Albania 
 Mania Papadimitriou as A's Mother

Production
The film is part of Angelopoulos's trilogy on borders. It was his first film made outside of Greece. The film screening at the beginning of the film was inspired by a screening of Angelopoulos's earlier film The Suspended Step of the Stork. The dialog played over loudspeakers in the town square was spoken by Marcello Mastroianni

The actor Gian Maria Volonté died during the filming. He was replaced by Erland Josephson and the film was dedicated to Volonté's memory.

Soundtrack
The score by Eleni Karaindrou featuring Kim Kashkashian on viola was released on the ECM label in 1995.

Accolades
Grand Jury Prize - 1995 Cannes Film Festival
Critics Award 1995 - European Film Academy
All-TIME 100 Movies - TIME magazine
The Top 100 Films of All Time - The Moving Arts Film Journal

See also
 List of submissions to the 68th Academy Awards for Best Foreign Language Film
 List of Greek submissions for the Academy Award for Best Foreign Language Film

References

External links
 
 
 
 
 Ulysses' Gaze (1995) TIME Magazine All-Time 100 best films

1995 drama films
1995 films
English-language Greek films
1990s Greek-language films
Romanian-language films
Bosnian-language films
Serbian-language films
Films directed by Theodoros Angelopoulos
Films shot in Serbia
Films based on the Odyssey
Films set in Greece
Films set in Albania
Films set in North Macedonia
Films set in Bulgaria
Films set in Bosnia and Herzegovina
Films set in Romania
Films set in Serbia
Films with screenplays by Tonino Guerra
Films scored by Eleni Karaindrou
Films shot in Florina
Greek drama films
Modern adaptations of the Odyssey
Cannes Grand Prix winners
1990s English-language films
1995 multilingual films
Greek multilingual films